Red lemonade is a soft drink sold in Ireland and regarded as distinctively a part of the cultural identity of Irish people.

Lemonade in Ireland traditionally comes in three varieties – red, brown and white. All three are lemon-flavoured, but there is a marked difference in taste between the varieties. Red lemonade is particularly associated with festive occasions, but can also be a folk remedy.

Red lemonade is drunk on its own and is also served as a mixer with spirits in Ireland, particularly in whiskey. Major brands of red lemonade include: TK (formerly Taylor Keith), Country Spring, Finches and Nash's. Major brands include Maine, Yacht and C&C (Cantrell & Cochrane). There was an urban myth that European Union authorities had banned red lemonade, but in fact the authorities had simply banned a cancer-causing dye.

References

External links 
 C&C group
 Nash's Red Lemonade (from the makers of Finches)
 Country Spring White and Red Lemonade

Irish cuisine
Lemonade